Denise Tillmanns (born 25 August 1984) is a German singer. She was the runner-up on the second season of Deutschland sucht den Superstar. She joined the top thirteen on 8 October 2003, being one of the first two members of the final group. On 13 March 2003 she lost in the final night to Elli Erl.

DSDS performances 

Top 50 (group 1): "There You'll Be" (Faith Hill)
Top 13: "Forever and for Always" (Shania Twain)
Top 11: "What's Love Got to Do with It" (Tina Turner)
Top 10: "Self Control" (Laura Branigan)
Top 9: "Rocking around the Christmas Tree" (Brenda Lee)
Top 8: "The Power of Goodbye" (Madonna)
Top 7: "Hit the Road Jack" (Ray Charles)
Top 6: "I Will Survive" (Gloria Gaynor)
Top 5: "(Everything I Do) I Do It for You" (Bryan Adams)
Top 4: "Can't Fight the Moonlight" (LeAnn Rimes)
Top 4: "The Power of Love" (Jennifer Rush)
Top 3: "Downtown" (Petula Clark)
Top 3: "Stop! In the Name of Love" (The Supremes)
Top 2: "I Will Survive" (Gloria Gaynor)
Top 2: "Natural Woman" (Aretha Franklin)
Top 2: "This Is My Life" (winning song)- Runner-up
DSDS 2 Celebration live: duet with (Aida Iljasevic) — "Tell Him" (Barbra Streisand)

References

1984 births
Living people
Deutschland sucht den Superstar participants
21st-century German  women  singers